Saltimbocca, also spelled saltinbocca, is an Italian dish (also popular in southern Switzerland). It consists of veal that has been wrapped ("lined") with prosciutto and sage, and then marinated in wine, oil, or salt water, depending on the region or one's own taste.

The original version of this dish is saltimbocca alla Romana ("saltimbocca Roman-style"), which consists of veal, prosciutto and sage, rolled up and cooked in dry white wine and butter. Marsala is sometimes used. Also, sometimes the veal and prosciutto are not rolled up but left flat. An American variation replaces the veal with chicken or pork.

See also 

 Braciola
 Scaloppine
 List of veal dishes
 List of Italian dishes

References

Il nuovo Cucchiaio d'Argento, 5th ed.(1959), Vera Rossi Lodomez, Franca Matricardi, Franca Bellini, Renato Gruau.

External links

 How to prepare saltimbocca alla Romana video
 Saltimbocca alla Romana

Italian cuisine
Pork dishes
Italian chicken dishes
Veal dishes
Italian meat dishes